Pulyny Raion (until 2016 Chervonoarmiisk Raion, Ukrainian: Червоноармійський район) was a raion (district) of Zhytomyr Oblast, northern Ukraine. Its administrative centre was located at Pulyny. The raion was abolished on 18 July 2020 as part of the administrative reform of Ukraine, which reduced the number of raions of Zhytomyr Oblast to four. The area of Pulyny Raion was merged into Zhytomyr Raion. The last estimate of the raion population was 

On 19 May 2016, Verkhovna Rada adopted decision to rename Chervonoarmiisk Raion to Pulyny Raion according to the law prohibiting names of Communist origin.

References

Former raions of Zhytomyr Oblast
1923 establishments in Ukraine
Ukrainian raions abolished during the 2020 administrative reform